Chattan is a village the Mirpur Tehsil of Mirpur District of Azad Kashmir.

Demography 

According to 1998 census of Pakistan, its population was 126.

History 

Like many villages in the Mirpur region, many of its residents have emigrated to the United Kingdom.

References 

Populated places in Mirpur District